Zagarancea is a commune in Ungheni District, Moldova. It is composed of three villages: Elizavetovca, Semeni and Zagarancea.

References

Communes of Ungheni District
Populated places on the Prut